Xiao Riben is a derogatory Chinese slang term for the Japanese people or a person of Japanese descent.  Literally translated, it means "little Japan". It is often used with "guizi" or ghost/devil, such as "xiao Riben guizi", or "little Japanese devil".

Usage
This is a largely archaic term used in China as a result of the Sino-Japanese Wars in offense to the Japanese forces at the time.

See also
 Jap
 Guizi
 Gweilo
 Hinomoto Oniko
 Shina - Japanese counterpart to insult Chinese people

References

Anti-Asian slurs
China–Japan relations
Anti-Japanese sentiment in China